The Britannia Range is an Antarctic mountain range bounded by the Hatherton and Darwin glaciers on the north and the Byrd Glacier on the south, westward of the Ross Ice Shelf. Discovered by the British National Antarctic Expedition (1901–04) under Scott.

Named after HMS Britannia, a vessel utilized as a naval college in England, which had been attended by several officers of Scott's expedition.

Features

 Abus Valley
 Adams Crest
 Banna Peak
 Beale Peak
 Bellum Valley
 Benson Bluff
 Berry Bastion
 Borowski Peak
 Brier Icefalls
 Casatelli Peak
 Cohn Bluff
 Danum Platform
 Darnell Nunatak
 Dartmouth Peak
 DeGalan Peak
 Doll Peak
 Dubris Valley
 Dusky Ledge
 Dusky Ridge
 Forbes Ridge
 Hourihan Glacier
 Hughes Basin
 Icenhower Ridge
 Jacobs Peak
 Johnson Spire
 Johnstone Ridge
 Krissek Peak
 Lemanis Valley
 Lucia Peak
 Magnis Ridge
 Marty Nunataks
 Menster Ledge
 Metaris Valley
 Moore Pinnacle
 Mount Aldrich
 Mount Askin
 Mount Brunswick
 Mount Henderson
 Mount McClintock
 Mount Quackenbush
 Mount Rhone
 Mount Selby
 Nebraska Peaks
 Onnum Ridge
 Onnum Valley
 Operose Peak
 Peckham Glacier
 Pontes Ridge
 Pritchard Peak
 Ragotzkie Glacier
 Rand Peak
 Sabrina Ridge
 Sabrina Valley
 Saburro Peak
 Sennet Glacier
 Stahl Peak
 Sternberg Peak
 Sullivan Knoll
 Three Nunataks
 Tisobis Valley
 Tyke Nunatak
 Vantage Hill
 Venta Plateau
 Waldrip Ledge
 Warburton Ledge
 Ward Tower
 Westhaven Nunatak
 Yancey Glacier

Further reading
 Carosi, R., F. Giacomini, F. Talarico, and E. Stump, Geology of the Byrd Glacier Discontinuity (Ross Orogen): New survey data from the Britannia Range, Antarctica , U.S. Geological Survey and The National Academies; USGS OF-2007-1047, Short Research Paper 030; doi:10.3133/of2007-1047.srp030
 Edited by M.J. Hambrey, P.F. Barker, P.J. Barrett, V. Bowman, B. Davies, J.L. Smellie, M. Tranter Antarctic Palaeoenvironments and Earth-Surface Processes, P 310
 Gunter Faure, Teresa M. Mensing, The Transantarctic Mountains: Rocks, Ice, Meteorites and Water, PP 663, 709

External links

 
Mountain ranges of the Ross Dependency
Hillary Coast